The Amateur Sports Alliance of North America (ASANA) is a non-profit women's softball organization.

ASANA formed in 2007 as an offshoot of the North American Gay Amateur Athletic Alliance (NAGAAA). The current commissioner is Angela Smith of Atlanta, Georgia.

Teams from 23 cities participate in the ASANA Softball World Series each year, with the venue rotating among the member cities.

The 2016 World Series will be held in Kansas City, Missouri

The 2017 World Series will be held in Austin, Texas.

ASANA offers softball for women softball players of various skill and age levels. Six divisions comprise the women's division: A, B, C, D, E and 50+. The "A" division is considered the most challenging division, and the E division consists of mostly recreational level players.

Previous World Series Locations

External links 
Amateur Sports Alliance of North America

Member Associations
 Atlanta: Hotlanta Softball League
 Austin: Softball Austin
 Chicago: Chicago Metropolitan Sports Association
 Dallas: North Texas Women's Sports Association
 Fort Lauderdale: Sports Foundation of South Florida 
 Greater Palm Beach: Greater Palm Beaches Women's Softball League
 Houston: Houston's Women Softball League
 Kansas City: Heart of America Softball League
 Las Vegas: Las Vegas Gay Softball League 
 Long Beach: LB/OC Surf and Sun Softball
 Los Angeles: GLASA Women's Division 
 Madison: Madison's LGBT Softball League
 New York: Big Apple Softball League (BASL)
 Norfolk: Women's United Softball Association
 Orlando: Central Florida Softball League
 Philadelphia: City of Brotherly Love Softball
 Portland: Rose City Softball Association
 San Diego: America's Finest City Softball League 
 San Francisco: San Francisco Gay Softball League 
 San Jose: San Jose Women's Softball League
 Seattle: Emerald City Softball Association 
 Washington DC: Chesapeake & Potomac Softball

References

Softball organizations
2007 establishments in the United States